

or

ora-orb
Ora-Testryl
Orabase HCA
Oracort
Oragrafin
Oralone
Oramorph SR
Orap
Orapred
Oraqix
Orasone
Oratane (Douglas Pharmaceuticals). Redirects to isotretinoin.
orazamide (INN)
orazipone (INN)
orbifloxacin (INN)
orbofiban (INN)
orbutopril (INN)

orc-orm
orciprenaline (INN)
orconazole (INN)
oregovomab (INN)
orestrate (INN)
Oretic
Oreticyl
Oreton Methyl
Orfadin
Orgaran
Orgatrax
orgotein (INN)
orientiparcin (INN)
Orinase
Orlaam
Orlex
orlistat (INN)
ormaplatin (INN)
ormeloxifene (INN)
ormetoprim (INN)

orn-orv
Ornade
ornidazole (INN)
Ornidyl
ornipressin (INN)
ornithine (INN)
ornoprostil (INN)
orotic acid (INN)
orotirelin (INN)
orpanoxin (INN)
orphenadrine (INN)
Orphengesic
ortetamine (INN)
Ortho Cyclen
Ortho Evra
Ortho Tri-Cyclen
Ortho-Cept
Ortho-Est
Ortho-Novum
Orthoclone OKT3
Orudis
Oruvail
orvepitant (USAN)

os-ov
osalmid (INN)
osanetant (INN)
osaterone (INN)
osimertinib (USAN, INN)
osmadizone (INN)
Osmitrol
Osmovist
ospemifene (USAN)
Osteolite
Osteoscan
ostreogrycin (INN)
osutidine (INN)
otelixizumab (USAN)
otenabant (USAN)
otenzepad (INN)
Oticair
otilonium bromide (INN)
otimerate sodium (INN)
Otobione
Otobiotic
Otocort
OvaRex
Ovcon
ovemotide (USAN)
Ovide
Ovidrel
Ovral
Ovrette
Ovulen